Zulfiqar, also spelled Zu al-Faqar, Zulfikar, Dhu al-Faqar, Dhulfaqar or Dhulfiqar, is the sword of Ali ibn Abi Talib. 

Middle Eastern weapons are commonly inscribed with a quote mentioning Zulfiqar, and Middle Eastern swords are at times made with a split tip in reference to the weapon.

Name
The meaning of the name is uncertain. The word ḏhu means "possessor, master", and the idafa construction "possessor of..." is common in Arabic phraseology, such as in Dhu al-Qarnayn, Dhu al-Kifl, Dhu al-Qadah and Dhu al-Hijjah.

The meaning of faqār, means "splitter, differentiatior". It is often vocalized as fiqār instead of faqār; Lane cites authorities preferring faqār however the vocalization fiqār still sees more widespread use. The word faqār has the meaning of "the vertebrae of the back, the bones of the spine, which are set in regular order, one upon another", but may also refer to other instances of regularly spaced rows, specifically it is a name of the stars of the belt of Orion.

Interpretations of the sword's name as found in Islamic theological writings or popular piety fall into four categories:
reference to the stars of the belt of Orion, emphasizing the celestial provenance of the sword
interpretation of faqār as an unfamiliar plural of fuqrah "notch, groove, indentation", interpreted as a reference to a kind of decoration of regularly spaced notches or dents on the sword
reference to a "notch" formed by the sword's supposed termination in two points
reference to the literal vertebrae of the spine, yielding an interpretation in the sense of "the severer of the vertebrae; the spine-splitter"
The latter interpretation gives rise to the popular depiction of the sword as a double-pointed scimitar in modern Shia iconography. Heger (2008) considers two additional possibilities: 
the name in origin referred simply to a double-edged sword (i.e. an actual sword rather than a sabre or scimitar), the μάχαιρα δίστομη of the New Testament. 

fiqār is a corruption of firāq "distinction, division", and the name originally referred to the metaphorical sword discerning between right and wrong.

Invocation and depiction

Zulfiqar was frequently depicted on Ottoman flags, especially as used by Janissaries cavalry, in the 16th and 17th centuries.

Zulfiqar is also frequently invoked in talismans. A common talismanic inscription or invocation is the double statement:
 

"There is no sword but the Zulfiqar, and there is no Hero but Ali"

The order of the two-part phrase is sometimes reversed, instead saying "there is no Hero but Ali, and there is no sword but the Zulfiqar". A record of this statement as part of a longer talismanic inscription was published by Tewfik Canaan in The Decipherment of Arabic Talismans (1938).
Heger (2008) speculates that the talismanic formula may be old and may have originated as a Christian invocation.

Legendary background
In legend, the exclamation  was given after Muhammad asked God to give him a sword. The sword appears in Muhammad's hands and then Muhammad throws the sword to Ali to replace his old broken sword.

Al-Tirmidhi attributes to Ibn Abbas the tradition that Muhammad acquired the sword on the day of Badr, after he had seen it in a dream concerning the day of Uhud.

Modern references
In Qajar Iran, actual swords were produced based on the legendary double-pointed design. Thus, the Higgins Collection holds a ceremonial sabre with a wootz steel blade, dated to the late 19th century, with a cleft tip. The curator comments that "fractures in the tip were not uncommon in early wootz blades from Arabia" suggesting that the legendary double-pointed design is based on a common type of damage incurred by blades in battle. The tip of this specimen is split in the blade plane, i.e. "For about 8" of its length from the point the blade is vertically divided along its axis, producing side-by-side blades, each of which is finished in itself", in the curator's opinion "a virtuoso achievement by a master craftsman". Another 19th-century blade in the same collection features a split blade as well as saw-tooths along the edge, combining two possible interpretations of the name Dhu-l-Faqar. This blade is likely of Indian workmanship, and it was combined with an older (Mughal era) Indian hilt.

"Zulfiqar" and its phonetic variations has come into use as given name, as with former Pakistani Prime Minister Zulfikar Ali Bhutto.

In Iran, the name of the sword has been used as an eponym in military contexts; thus, Reza Shah Pahlavi renamed the military order Portrait of the Commander of Faithful to Order of Zolfaghar in 1925. The 58th Takavar Division of Shahroud is also named after the sword.

An Iranian main battle tank is also named after the sword, Zulfiqar.

Gallery

References

Middle Eastern swords
Mythological swords
Islamic mythology
Shia Islam
Amulets
Heraldic charges
Islamic terminology
Life of Muhammad
Islamic religious objects
Ali
Sunni Islam